Lioxanthodes is a genus of crabs in the family Xanthidae, containing the following species:

 Lioxanthodes alcocki Calman, 1909
 Lioxanthodes madagascariensis Serene, 1984
 Lioxanthodes pacificus Edmondson, 1935

References

Xanthoidea